Avondale is the name of several communities in the U.S. state of West Virginia.

Avondale, Doddridge County, West Virginia
Avondale, McDowell County, West Virginia